The Howell automatic rifle is a semi automatic conversion of the Lee–Enfield rifle. The weapon was reliable with the gas piston on the right side of the gun but not ergonomic for the user as the force of the recoiling bolt interfered with handling and since the gun was dramatic when fired. Similar conversions were the South African Rieder and Charlton of New Zealand origin which had full automatic capability. During early World War II when supplies were low, some Howell rifles were issued to the Home Guard.

See also 
 Charlton automatic rifle
 Rieder automatic rifle

References

External links
 Howell Automatic Rifle at the Royal Armouries
 Forgotten Weapons' brief overview of the Howell

.303 British battle rifles
Light machine guns
Trial and research firearms of the United Kingdom
Rifles of the United Kingdom